Helge Valentin Andersson (25 June 1897 – 5 February 1976) was a Swedish footballer who played for Hammarby. He featured twice for the Sweden national football team in 1921 and 1922.

Career statistics

International

References

1897 births
1976 deaths
Footballers from Stockholm
Swedish footballers
Sweden international footballers
Association football defenders
Hammarby Fotboll players